Pidonia lurida is a species of the Lepturinae subfamily in the long-horned beetle family. This beetle is distributed in Central and Southeast Europe, Russia, north of Italy and France. Larvae develop in deciduous and coniferous trees.

Subtaxons 
There are three varieties in species:
 Pidonia lurida var. ganglbaueri Ormay 
 Pidonia lurida var. notaticollis Pic 
 Pidonia lurida var. suturalis Olivier

References

Lepturinae
Beetles described in 1792